The Communist Party of the Republic of China was a political party in the Republic of China (Taiwan). It was officially registered on 31 March 2009 by the Ministry of the Interior, making it the 147th registered political party in the country and the second legally named "communist party" in Taiwan after the Taiwan Communist Party.

The party's inaugural meeting was held at the Chung-Shan Building in the Yangmingshan National Park in October 2008 and is led by Lu Yubao as the party's chairman and Chen Tianfu as the General Secretary. The party supported the platform of the Chinese Communist Party and Chinese unification.

The party was dissolved by the Ministry of Interior on 23 May 2018.

See also 
 Taiwan Democratic Communist Party

References 

2009 establishments in Taiwan
Communist parties in Taiwan
Organizations associated with the Chinese Communist Party
Political parties established in 2009
Chinese nationalist political parties